Beneath the Veil of Winter's Face is the third studio album by the Canadian rock band Mystery.  It is the first Mystery album to feature Benoît David on lead vocals, and the first without former lead vocalist Gary Savoie. The band's lineup remained unchanged aside from this. Originally to be recorded soon after Destiny?, it was released in 2007 due to Michel St-Père shifting his focus to his record label. This was the last album to feature bassist Patrick Bourque, who died shortly after the album's release.

Production

Background

Work for Beneath the Veil of Winter's Face started around the turn of the millennium but due to a variety of reasons, including Michel St-Père's work on his record label Unicorn Digital and the conversion of the recording studio into a completely digital one, the album took several years to complete.

Originally the album was meant to be a concept album following the rise and fall of a young artist, but then-new singer Benoît David suggested to drop the concept aspect of it. The track listing was slightly different in the planning stages of the album, and was meant to include the title track from One Among the Living originally.

Richard Addison, Mystery's original bassist, was going to play bass on the album, but ultimately did not.

The album was meant to be released sometime in 2000, was pushed back to the fall of 2001, then pushed back to the fall of 2003, and was finally released on May 15, 2007.

Recording
Beneath the Veil of Winter's Face was recorded on ADAT and then transferred to a computer for mixing.

Track listing

Personnel
Mystery
 Benoît David - lead vocals
 Michel St-Père - electric and acoustic guitars, bass, keyboards
 Steve Gagné - drums
 Patrick Bourque - bass

Additional musicians
 Antoine Fafard - bass
 Benoît Pépin - bass
 Serge Gangloff - special wind FX

Release information
 CD - Unicorn Digital - UNCR-5040 - 2007
 CD - ProgRock Records - PRR640 - 2008
 Vinyl - Oskar - 030LP/031LP - 2021

References

2007 albums
Mystery (band) albums